Eugène Afrika (born 14 April 1971) is a retired Luxembourgian football midfielder.

References

1971 births
Living people
Luxembourgian footballers
FA Red Boys Differdange players
Union Luxembourg players
Jeunesse Esch players
Association football midfielders
Luxembourg international footballers